The Casting Society, formerly known as Casting Society of America (CSA), was founded in Los Angeles, California, in 1982 as a professional society of about 1,200 casting directors and associate casting directors for film, television, theatre, and commercials in Canada, Europe, Australia, Asia and Africa, and the United States. The nonprofit organization announced the name change from Casting Society of America to Casting Society on February 10, 2022. The society is not to be confused with an industry union. The International Brotherhood of Teamsters represent most (though not all) of the major casting directors and associate casting directors in Hollywood. Members use the post-nominal letters "CSA" when credited for their work.

Membership eligibility
The following requirements must be met in order to join the CSA:
Sponsorship letters from at least two current members of the CSA.
Two years of screen or stage credit as Primary Casting Director.

Casting directors who are also personal managers are not eligible for membership in the CSA.

Artios Awards
Since October 1985, the Casting Society has presented the Artios Awards for excellence in casting. Members are honored in over 25 different casting categories in simultaneous events held in Beverly Hills, New York City and London.

List of ceremonies 
 2023 – 38th Artios Awards
 2022 – 37th Artios Awards
 2021 – 36th Artios Awards
 2020 – 35th Artios Awards
 2019 – 34th Artios Awards
 2018 – 33rd Artios Awards
 2017 – 32nd Artios Awards
 2016 – 31st Artios Awards
 2015 – 30th Artios Awards
 2014 – no awards - shifted from Fall into Awards Season
 2013 – 29th Artios Awards
 2012 – 28th Artios Awards
 2011 – 27th Artios Awards
 2010 – 26th Artios Awards
 2009 – 25th Artios Awards
 2008 – 24th Artios Awards
 2007 – 23rd Artios Awards
 2006 – 22nd Artios Awards
 2005 – 21st Artios Awards
 2004 – 20th Artios Awards
 2003 – 19th Artios Awards
 2002 – 18th Artios Awards
 2001 – 17th Artios Awards
 2000 – 16th Artios Awards
 1999 – 15th Artios Awards
 1998 – 14th Artios Awards
 1997 – 13th Artios Awards
 1996 – 12th Artios Awards
 1995 – 11th Artios Awards
 1994 – 10th Artios Awards
 1993 – 9th Artios Awards
 1992 – 8th Artios Awards
 1991 – 7th Artios Awards
 1990 – 6th Artios Awards
 1989 – 5th Artios Awards
 1988 – 4th Artios Awards
 1987 – 3rd Artios Awards
 1986 – 2nd Artios Awards
 1985 – 1st Artios Awards

Categories

Film 

 Animated Voice-Over Casting (1993–present)
 Big Budget Feature Casting — Comedy (1985–present)
 Big Budget Feature Casting — Drama (1985–present)
 Studio or Independent – Comedy
 Studio or Independent – Drama
 Low Budget – Comedy Or Drama
 Micro Budget – Comedy or Drama

Television 

 Comedy Episodic Casting (1985–present)
 Dramatic Episodic Casting (1985–present)
 Movie of the Week Casting (1985–present)
 Mini-Series Casting (1985–present)
 Daytime Casting (1986–1996)
 Soaps Casting (1989–present)
 Pilot Casting (1991–present)
 Animated Voice-Over Casting (1993–present)
 Nighttime Special Casting (1993–present)
 Comedy Pilot Casting (1996–present)
 Dramatic Pilot Casting (1996–present)
 Daytime Special Casting (1996–present)

Theatre 

 Theatre Casting — Plays (1988–present)
 Theatre Casting — Musical (1988–present)

Miscellaneous 

 Lifetime Achievement Award (1995–present)

1st Artios Awards 
1985 Artios Awards for the calendar year 1984 — October 30, 1985.

Winners and nominees

2nd Artios Awards 
1986 Artios Awards for the calendar year 1985 — October 29, 1986, except for Episodic Television which was June 1, 1985 to May 31, 1986, and short order series aired between January 1, 1985, and May 31, 1985.

Winners and nominees

3rd Artios Awards 
1987 Artios Awards for the calendar year 1986 — October 30, 1987, except for Episodic Television which was June 1, 1986 to May 31, 1987, and short order series aired between January 1, 1986, and May 31, 1986.

Winners and nominees

4th Artios Awards 
1988 Artios Awards for the calendar year 1987 – October 26, 1988 

Winners and nominees

5th Artios Awards 
1989 Artios Awards for the calendar year 1988 — October 25, 1989.

Winners and nominees

6th Artios Awards 
1990 Artios Awards for the calendar year 1989 — October 31, 1990.

Winners and nominees

7th Artios Awards 
1991 Artios Awards for the calendar year 1990 — October 17, 1991.

Winners and nominees

8th Artios Awards 
1992 Artios Awards for the calendar year 1991 — October 20, 1992.

Winners and nominees

9th Artios Awards 
1993 Artios Awards for the calendar year 1992 — October 19, 1993.

Winners and nominees

10th Artios Awards 
1994 Artios Awards for the calendar year 1993 — October 20, 1994.

Winners and nominees

11th Artios Awards 
1995 Artios Awards for the calendar year  1994 — October 11, 1995.

Winners and nominees

Lifetime Achievement Award: Garry Marshall (recipient)

12th Artios Awards 
1996 Artios Awards for the calendar year 1995 — October 15, 1996.

Winners and nominees

Lifetime Achievement Award: David Gerber (recipient)

13th Artios Awards 
1997 Artios Awards for the calendar year 1996 — November 12, 1997. 

Hoyt Bowers Award — Outstanding contribution to the Casting Profession: Juliet Taylor (recipient)

Lifetime Achievement Award: Roger Corman (recipient)

References

External links

Artios Award winners

Entertainment industry societies
Film organizations in the United States
Theatrical organizations in the United States
International film awards
American film awards
American television awards
American theater awards
Professional associations based in the United States
Post-nominal letters
1982 establishments in California
Organizations based in Los Angeles
Casting awards
Organizations established in 1982